Ulen may refer to:

People
Thomas Ulen, an American law and economics professor

Places

Norway
Ulen (lake), a lake in the municipality of Lierne in Trøndelag county

United States
Ulen, Indiana, a town in Center Township, Boone County, Indiana
Ulen Historic District, a national historic district located at Ulen, Boone County, Indiana
Ulen, Minnesota, a small city in Clay County, Minnesota
Ulen Township, Clay County, Minnesota, a township in Clay County, Minnesota

Other
Upuh Ulen-Ulen, a traditional cloth of the Gayonese people in Aceh (Indonesia).

See also
Ulen sword